Prototheora angolae is a species of moth of the family Prototheoridae. It is found in Angola, where it known only from the type locality which is located in central Angola.

The wingspan is about 20 mm. Adults have been recorded in early November.

Etymology
The specific name is derived from the genitive form of the country of origin, Angola.

References

Endemic fauna of Angola
Hepialoidea
Insects of Angola
Moths of Africa
Moths described in 1996
Taxa named by Donald R. Davis (entomologist)